Grzegorz Drejgier (born 20 February 1990) is a track cyclist from Poland.

Career
As a junior rider he won the bronze medal in the team sprint at the 2008 UEC European Track Championships. In 2013 he competed at the 2013 UCI Track Cycling World Championships in the men's team sprint. He won the silver medal in the team sprint at the 2015 UEC European Track Championships in Grenchen, Switzerland.

References

1990 births
Polish male cyclists
Living people
Place of birth missing (living people)
Polish track cyclists
21st-century Polish people